Altered Genesis is the third studio album by Norwegian death metal band, Blood Red Throne.  The album was released on February 21, 2005 by Earache Records.

Track listing 
All songs published by Earache Songs (UK) Ltd.
 "Death to Birth" (2:41; Lyrics: Mr. Hustler/Music: Jani Havukainen)
 "Incarnadine Mangler" (3:44; Lyrics: Jon Tønnessen/Music: Død and Tchort)
 "Tortured Soul Appearance" (4:52; Lyrics: Mr. Hustler/Music: Dod and Tchort) 
 "Eye-Licker" (4:02; Lyrics: Tonnessen/Music: Dod and Tchort)
 "Mephitication" (4:38; Lyrics: Mr. Hustler/Music: Dod and Tchort)
 "Arterial Lust" (4:56; Lyrics: Tonnessen/Music: Dod and Tchort)
 "Flesh to Destroy" (3:47; Lyrics: Mr. Hustler/Music: Dod and Tchort)
 "Ripsaw Resentment" (4:24; Lyrics: Mr. Hustler/Music: Dod and Tchort)
 "Altered Genesis - Creation and Sudden Demise" (5:41; Lyrics: Mr. Hustler/Music: Dod and Tchort)
 "Smite" (3:51; Lyrics: Mr. Hustler/Music: Dod and Tchort)
 "State of Darkness" (3:50; Lyrics: Tonnessen/Music: Dod and Tchort)
 "Deliberate Carnage" (3:42; Lyrics: Tonnessen/Music: Dod and Tchort)

Personnel 

Daniel "Død" Olaisen - Guitar
Terje "Tchort" Vik Schei - Guitar
Erlend Caspersen - Bass
Mr. Hustler - Vocals
Bernt A. Moen - Drums

References

2005 albums
Blood Red Throne albums
Earache Records albums